Raymond Bowen (16 June 1906 – 29 May 1968) was a South African cricketer. He played in twenty-one first-class matches for Border from 1925/26 to 1934/35.

See also
 List of Border representative cricketers

References

External links
 

1906 births
1968 deaths
South African cricketers
Border cricketers
Cricketers from East London, Eastern Cape